The Academy of Fine Arts Vienna is a public art school in Vienna, Austria.

History 
The Academy of Fine Arts Vienna was founded in 1692 as a private academy modelled on the Accademia di San Luca and the Parisien Académie de peinture et de sculpture by the court-painter Peter Strudel, who became the Praefectus Academiae Nostrae. In 1701 he was ennobled by Emperor Joseph I as Freiherr (Baron) of the Empire. With his death in 1714, the academy temporarily closed.

On 20 January 1725, Emperor Charles VI appointed the Frenchman Jacob van Schuppen as Prefect and Director of the Academy, which was refounded as the k.k. Hofakademie der Maler, Bildhauer und Baukunst (Imperial and Royal Court Academy of painters, sculptors and architecture). Upon Charles's death in 1740, the academy at first declined, however during the rule of his daughter Empress Maria Theresa, a new statute reformed the academy in 1751. The prestige of the academy grew during the deanships of Michelangelo Unterberger and Paul Troger, and in 1767 the archduchesses Maria Anna and Maria Carolina were made the first Honorary Members. In 1772, there were further reforms to the organisational structure. In 1776 the engraver Jakob Matthias Schmutzer founded a school of engraving.  This Imperial-Royal Academy of Engraving in the Annagasse soon competed with the Court Academy.

Chancellor Wenzel Anton Kaunitz integrated all existing art academies into the k.k. vereinigten Akademie der bildenden Künste (Imperial and Royal Unified Academy of Fine Arts). The word "vereinigten" (unified) was later dropped. In 1822 the art cabinet grew significantly with the bequest of honorary member Anton Franz de Paula Graf Lamberg-Sprinzenstein. His collection still forms the backbone of the art on display.

In 1872 Emperor Franz Joseph I of Austria approved a statute making the academy the supreme government authority for the arts. A new building was constructed according to plans designed by the faculty Theophil Hansen in the course of the layout of the Ringstraße boulevard. On 3 April 1877, the present-day building on Schillerplatz in the Innere Stadt district was inaugurated, the interior works, including ceiling frescos by Anselm Feuerbach, continued until 1892. In 1907 and 1908, young Adolf Hitler, who had come from Linz, was twice denied admission to the drawing class. He stayed in Vienna, subsisting on his orphan allowance, and tried unsuccessfully to continue his profession as an artist. Soon he had withdrawn into poverty and started selling amateur paintings, mostly watercolours, for meagre sustenance until he left Vienna for Munich in May 1913 (see also, Paintings by Adolf Hitler).

During the Austrian Anschluss to Nazi Germany from 1938–1945, the academy, like other Austrian universities, was forced to purge its staff and student body of Jews and others that fell under the purview of the Nuremberg Racial Laws. After World War II, the academy was reconstituted in 1955 and its autonomy reconfirmed. Eduard von Josch, the secretary of the Academy, was dismissed for being a member of the NSDAP. The academy has had university status since 1998, but retained its original name. It is currently the only Austrian university without the word "university" in its name.

Structure 
The academy is divided into the following institutes: 
 Institute for Fine Arts, which houses thirteen departments: Abstract Painting; Art and Digital Media; Art and Photography; Arts and Research; Conceptual Art; Contextual Painting; Expanded Pictorial Space; Figurative Painting; Graphic Arts and Printmaking Techniques; Object Sculpture; Performative Art - Sculpture; Video and Video-installation; Textual Sculpture
 Institute for Art Theory and Cultural Studies (art theory, philosophy, history);
 Institute for Conservation and Restoration;
 Institute for Natural Sciences and Technologies in Art;
 Institute for Secondary School Teaching Degrees (craft, design, textile arts);
 Institute for Art and Architecture.

The Academy currently has about 900 students, almost a quarter of which are foreign students. Its faculty includes "stars" such as Peter Sloterdijk. Its library houses about 110,000 volumes and its "etching cabinet" (Kupferstichkabinett) has about 150,000 drawings and prints. The collection is one of the biggest in Austria, and is used for academic purposes, although portions are also open to the general public.

Notable alumni

Other students and professors 

 Karl Aigen (1684–1762), student, director and professor
 Oz Almog, (born 1956)
 Alois Arnegger (1879–1963)
 Joannis Avramidis (1922–2016)
 Peter Behrens (1868–1940)
 Sabeth Buchmann (born 1962)
 Menci Clement Crnčić (1865–1930)
 Konstantin Danil (1802–1873)
 Saeed Danosian (1979–1985)
 Diedrich Diederichsen (born 1957)
 Andrea Maria Dusl (born 1961)
 Thomas Ender (1793–1875)
 Harun Farocki (1944–2014)
 Anselm Feuerbach (1829–1880), professor (1873)
 Emil Fuchs (1866–1929)
 Ernst Fuchs (1930–2015)
 Peter Johann Nepomuk Geiger (1805–1880), professor
 Richard Gerstl (1883–1908)
 Edwin Grienauer (1893–1964)
 Gottfried Helnwein (born 1948)
 F. Scott Hess (born 1955)
 Clemens Holzmeister (1886–1983)
 Friedensreich Hundertwasser (1928–2000)
 Li Hua (born 1980)
 Greta Kempton, (1901–1991)
 Anton Lehmden (1929–2018)
 Maximilian Liebenwein (1869–1926)
 Leopold Matzal (1890–1956)
 Franz Anton Maulbertsch (1724–1796)
 Ludwig Merwart (1913–1979)
 Joseph Mössmer (1780–1845)
 Caspar Neher (1897–1962)
 Gustav Peichl (1928–2019)
 Elmar Peintner (born 1954)
 Johann Georg Platzer (1704–1761)
 Roland Rainer (1910–2004)
 Daniel Richter (born 1962)
 Rudolph Schwarz (1840–1912)
 Robert Sedlacek (1881–1957)
 Nasrine Seraji (born 1957)
 Tamuna Sirbiladze (1971–2016)
 Hito Steyerl (born 1966)
 Paul Troger (1698–1762)
 Norbert Troller (1900–1984))
 Rudolf von Alt (1812–1905)
 Friedrich von Schmidt (1825–1891)
 Henrik Weber (1818–1866)
 Kurt Weiss (1895–1966)
 Albert Zimmermann (1808–1888)

Notable rejected applicants 
 Adolf Hitler

In fiction

The Academy of Fine Arts in 1908 is the scene of the early chapters of the 2001 Alternative History novel The Alternative Hypothesis ("La part de l'autre") by Éric-Emmanuel Schmitt. It is based on the assumption that had the young Adolf Hitler been accepted he might have become a recognized painter and never entered politics, and never become the dictator of Nazi Germany. The dramatic tension in the book's plot develops from the Academy staff, deliberating whether or not to admit Hitler, thinking of it as an unimportant matter concerning a single unknown student - while the readers are aware that in fact they are deciding the future of the entire world.

References

External links 

  
 Exhibition catalogues of Academy of Fine Arts in the Belvedere Digital Library
 website of the Media Server (archived 8 September 2005)
 Study in Austria: A Guide (archived 17 January 2005)

 
Universities and colleges in Austria
Art schools in Austria
Culture in Vienna
1692 establishments in Austria
Educational institutions established in the 1690s
Buildings and structures in Vienna
Art museums and galleries in Vienna
1692 in art
Theophil Hansen buildings